Pamphagodidae is a small family of grasshoppers in the Orthoptera: suborder Caelifera. Species in this family can be found in southern Africa and Morocco.

Placement and description
The oldest published name for this group is Pamphagodidae. However, the name Charilaidae became widely used, until a review by the International Commission on Zoological Nomenclature determined the valid name.

Members of this 'basal' grasshopper family tend to be large grasshoppers and are typically apterous or brachypterous.  A common feature for these genera is that the pronotum has two parallel median keels.

Genera
, genera and species in the family Pamphagodidae include:
Charilaus Stål, 1875
Charilaus carinatus Stål, 1875
Hemicharilaus Dirsh, 1953
Hemicharilaus brunneri (Saussure, 1899)
Hemicharilaus monomorphus (Uvarov, 1929)
Pamphagodes Bolívar, 1878
Pamphagodes riffensis Bolívar, 1878
Paracharilaus Dirsh, 1961
Paracharilaus curvicollis (Karny, 1910)

References

External links
 Images of Pamphagodes riffensis at acrinwafrica.mnhn.fr

Caelifera
Orthoptera families